Spencer Odom (born August 19, 1913, Chicago; died December 24, 1962 (age 49) New York City) was a pianist-arranger who conducted the music for the Frank Buck recording Tiger (record album).

Early years
Odom was the son of Carrie Combs and Walter D. Odom. He received public musical education at Chicago Piano College, with private lessons under T. T. Taylor and Mrs. Estelle Bonds. His theory, arranging, composition and orchestral training were received under Major N. Clark Smith, who formed an orchestra from his best students including Ray Nance, Oliver Coleman, Claud Adams and Jesse Simpkins.

Career
Odom was pianist and arranger for many well known bands, Dave Peyton and Lionel Hampton, and was the pianist for the popular Flying Home record. He also made arrangements for Vincent Lopez. He accompanied and arranged for the Southernaires and the Mariners with Arthur Godfrey.

Work with Frank Buck
In 1950, Odom was arranger and conductor for the Frank Buck recording Tiger (record album).

Death
Odom died of a heart attack Christmas Eve in his New York studio, the Showcase, while he and his associate, Bill Hyer, were rehearsing talent. A 15-minute break had been called and while Odom and his partner were talking, Odom suddenly slumped to the floor. Doctors were called but failed to revive him.

References

1913 births
1962 deaths
Musicians from Chicago
20th-century American pianists
American male pianists
20th-century American male musicians